Walenstadt railway station is a railway station in Walenstadt, in the Swiss canton of St. Gallen. It is an intermediate stop on the Ziegelbrücke–Sargans line.

Services 
The following services call at Walenstadt:

 St. Gallen S-Bahn : hourly service via St. Gallen (circular operation).

Layout and connections 

References

External links 
 
 

Railway stations in the canton of St. Gallen
Swiss Federal Railways stations